Ānandagarbha was a 9th-century Indian Buddhist tantric master notable for authoring numerous works including the Sarvavajrodayā and the Vajrajvālodayā. As per Tibetan sources, 25 works are attributed to him a few of which has survived in Sanskrit.

The Tibetan historian and monk, Taranatha noted that he was born into a Vaishya family in Magadha and associated with the Vikramashila monastery which was patronized by the Pala Empire. He was ordained the Mahāsāṃghika school of thought within Mahayana Buddhism.

The Vajrajvālodayā

The Vajrajvālodayā is a Sādhanā manual that is aimed towards the tantric deity Heruka and his mandala and consists of 17 leaves. The work has so far remained unpublished however parts of it have been transcribed and translated into English. Structurally, the work is similar to other ritual manuals like the Tattvasamgraha with the use of the same mudras and mantras.

References

Indian Buddhist monks
Monks of Vikramashila
9th-century Buddhist monks
9th-century births
9th-century deaths